Carla Sullivan (born 19 March 1976)  is a Paralympic swimming competitor from Australia. She was born in the Sydney suburb of Camperdown. She won a silver medal at the 1996 Atlanta Games in the Women's 100 m Freestyle MH event.

References

Female Paralympic swimmers of Australia
Swimmers at the 1996 Summer Paralympics
Paralympic silver medalists for Australia
Living people
Medalists at the 1996 Summer Paralympics
1976 births
Paralympic medalists in swimming
Australian female freestyle swimmers